Goldenacre is an area in Edinburgh, Scotland, lying on and to the south of the Ferry Road, and south of Trinity.

Transport links
The area is well-served for local transport, with six bus services provided by Lothian Buses.  Destinations include the City Centre, the shopping centre at South Gyle and the Royal Infirmary of Edinburgh at Little France.

Demographics and facilities
The area is considered to be broadly affluent, and is mostly residential with some commercial activity, especially around the junction of Ferry Road with Inverleith Row, such as a newsagent, a fishmonger, a dispensing chemist and an off-licence, plus some more specialist businesses such as a fishing tackle shop, and one of the UK's leading stamp shops. However the three bank branches (Bank of Scotland, Royal Bank of Scotland and TSB) that were previously situated in the area have all recently been closed. There are at least three sheltered housing communities.

Goldenacre Sports Ground, located within the Goldenacre Playing Fields, has played a historic role in the development of Scottish rugby union.  The Playing Fields belongs to George Heriot's School, and encompasses field hockey pitches, rugby pitches, cricket nets and a fenced, floodlit court used for tennis and football, amongst other activities.
There is a local bowling club, Goldenacre Bowling Club Ltd, and the neighbouring district of Inverleith is home to the Royal Botanic Garden, only a few minutes walk from Goldenacre.

External links
 Goldenacre Bowling Club
 Royal Botanic Garden Edinburgh
 Robert Murray Stamp Shop
 Heriot's Cricket Club

Areas of Edinburgh